The Yorkshire Imperial Band, nicknamed the Yorkshire Imps, is a brass band from West Yorkshire, England. Previous  names have included Yorkshire Imperial Metals Band, IMI Yorkshire Imperial Band, Yorkshire Imperial David Urquhart Travel Band, DUT Yorkshire Imperial Band and Yorkshire Imperial Urquhart Travel Band (from former long time sponsors David Urquhart Travel). )

The band was formed in the 1930s as the Yorkshire Copper Works Band based at the Yorkshire Copper Works in Stourton, Leeds, and was renamed when Yorkshire Imperial Metals was created in 1958, owned by Yorkshire Copper Works and ICI Metals Division.

The Rothwell Temperance Band was founded in 1881, when the drinkers and non-drinkers of the Rothwell Model Band, established in 1841 or earlier, divided to form two bands, the other being the Rothwell Old Band. In 1999 it was renamed the Wallace Arnold (Rothwell) Band, reflecting sponsorship by coach tour operator Wallace Arnold.  The then "B" band retained the name Rothwell Temperance Band and  still exists.  In 2000 the Wallace Arnold (Rothwell) Band merged with the Yorkshire Imperial Band, which became for some time the Yorkshire Imperial DUT (Rothwell) Band.

 the band was ranked 9th in Yorkshire  and 50th in the world in listings at brass band website 4barsrest.com.

The band has made many recordings, going back as far as the 1967 CBS Yorkshire Brass.

The band's logo shows an imp sitting on a Yorkshire rose.

References

External links

 Results in contests 1938–present

British brass bands
Musical groups from West Yorkshire